X-Large  is a 2011 Egyptian romantic comedy film. The title is making fun of the extra large sizes found in stores to categorize large clothes.

It stars Ahmed Helmy as the main character, Magdy.

Plot 

Magdy is a severely overweight man with a bunch of female friends who all see him as one of the girls, he’s about as sexually appealing to them as a teddy bear. All he wants is a woman who can see past his unsightly exterior and see him for who he is inside. He reconnects with Dina, a girl he had a crush on back when he was a skinny kid, via Facebook and they get to know each other over the phone, without ever having seen any pictures of each other.

Dina, upon returning to Egypt, asks Magdy to pick her up from the airport which he agrees to do while secretly praying that she doesn’t turn out to be too conventionally attractive. When Magdy sees how beautiful Dina is, he lacks the confidence to out himself as Magdy and instead introduces himself as Magdy’s cousin Adel and informs her that Magdy had to travel abroad. With his friends’ help, he proceeds to try to get her to love him as Adel, fat and all.

They then get to start dating and eventually Magdy proposes to Dina through showing her a showcase of art. She then says that the only reason she dated him was because of a college project examining the life of overweight people.

Madgy, depressed, starts to ask his uncle for help into losing weight. His uncle (who's also fat) claims that it's impossible and Madgy eventually gives up in a discussion with his friends.

Later, Magdy receives a phone call from his uncle who announces that he's dying. Magdy then rides his car but due to speeding, his car overturns. Several bystanders then try to get him out but can't due to his weight. But eventually he's able to go through the car door.

Magdy then arrives to his uncle's house, where he finds him in the floor. His uncles tells him his last words, "Get thin Magdy." And dies.

Magdy, now determined, finally tries to seriously lose weight. He contacts an old friend who is a fitness coach and Magdy joins the gym. He's also given a small shack to live in.

The next few weeks are very hard for Magdy. He stops going to the fridge at night and he's forced to stop an old habit of always eating when talking. He starts exercising more.

One day, Magdy starts drawing in his shack out of boredom. He then keeps drawing for a long time, not eating. He then realizes this and once he does, he leaves his shack, and starts shouting out, "I'm not hungry! I'm not hungry!" multiple times while it's raining.

Two years later, in a meeting announcing a new animated show, it's revealed many of the characters are attending, including Dina. Magdy now very thin, is not recognizable by anyone. He sits with Dina and Dina asks where Magdy, an old friend is. Magdy then claims that he's been in Australia for a couple years. He then says that's he's a good friend of Magdy.

The animated show starts and the Fitness Coach announces the artist of the animation. He reveals its Magdy. The people, surprised, realize he's talking about the obese person from years past.

Magdy is then seen smiling and thinking, "Life is good now." His stomach then bellows and he goes on to say, "I want to eat." The movie then ends, unclear about his future relationship with Dina.

Cast
 Ahmed Helmy as Magdy
 Donia Samir Ghanem as Dina
 Ibrahim Nasr as Azmy
 Khaled Sarhan as Hamada
 Emy Samir Ghanem as Mai
 Mohamed Shaheen as Samy
 Nahed El Sebai as Nany
 Yasmin Raeis as Riham
 Said Tarabeek as Magdy's manager
 Anaam Salosa as Dina's aunt

References

2011 films
2010s Arabic-language films
Films set in Egypt
2011 romantic comedy films
Egyptian romantic comedy films